Gerhard Bletschacher (born 1931) is a German politician, representative of the Christian Social Union of Bavaria.

He was elected as head of the council of Munich in 1984.

See also
List of Bavarian Christian Social Union politicians

References

Christian Social Union in Bavaria politicians
1931 births
Living people
Officers Crosses of the Order of Merit of the Federal Republic of Germany